Fifty Fathoms Deep is a 1931 American pre-Code adventure film directed by Roy William Neill starring Jack Holt, Mary Doran and Richard Cromwell. It was produced and distributed by Columbia Pictures.

Synopsis
In this high-seas adventure, a woman creates a great rift between old friends: an experienced older diver, and his younger protege. They become enemies when a gold-digger marries the latter. She soon leaves him in favor of a wealthy yachtsman. She is aboard his boat when an accident occurs. The two divers must salvage the costly boat before it sinks.

Cast
 Jack Holt as Tim Burke
 Mary Doran as 	Florine
 Richard Cromwell as 'Pinky' Caldwell
 Loretta Sayers as 	Myra
 Wallace MacDonald as Yacht First Mate
 Christina Montt as Conchita
 Henry Mowbray as Yacht Owsner

References

External links
 
 
 
 

1931 films
American adventure drama films
Columbia Pictures films
1930s adventure drama films
American black-and-white films
1931 drama films
Films directed by Roy William Neill
1930s English-language films
1930s American films